Escuderia Bandeirantes (English: Team Flag-followers) was a Brazilian motor racing team.

Complete Formula One World Championship results
(key) (Results in bold indicate pole position; results in italics indicate fastest lap.) 

 Indicates shared drive

References

Formula One entrants
Brazilian auto racing teams